The Firefox Guardian is a wildlife documentary directed by conservation filmmaker Gunjan Menon about red pandas and community-driven conservation in Nepal. It is a cross-genre intersectional documentary that discusses social issues faced by women in Nepal as well as an urgent need for conservation of endangered red pandas.

Plot
The Firefox Guardian tells the story of the first female forest guardian to work with Red Panda Network, Menuka. Set in the remote bamboo forests of the Eastern Himalayas in Nepal, this short film takes viewers on a mesmerising journey into the world of red pandas, seen through the eyes of a native woman. With the red panda numbers rapidly declining in the wild, this unconventional warrior brings hope to the future of red panda conservation.

Reception

The film premiered in Bristol, United Kingdom and was shortlisted for a student BAFTA award in 2018. It also won the Best Student Documentary at the CMS Vatavaran Film Festival, Woodpecker Film Festival, International Wildlife Film Festival, and among several national and international awards, was a part of the World Wildlife Day Film Showcase by Jackson Wild, United Nations Environment Program and CITES (Convention on International Trade in Endangered Species of Wild Flora and Fauna).

In a Sanctuary Asia review, the Firefox Guardian makes it to the top three in an article titled Ten Wildlife Short Films by Indian Filmmakers. "Another filmmaker may have tried to capitalise on Menuka’s charm or the ‘star quality’ of the fire fox, but Menon allows for the film to unfold gently and organically. Menon tells a succinct, moving story, and testament to her success is the fact that I was left wet-eyed by the film", writes the Commissioning Editor, Cara Tejpal.

"This film is not only a conglomeration of life stories about hard work with the passion for protecting nature but also plays an important role in depicting women empowerment." — Riya Saha, HLC Cult Critic

Awards and nominations

 BAFTA Student Awards Shortlist, 2018
 Best Student Short Documentary — International Wildlife Film Festival, Missoula, Montana, 2018
 Honourable Mention — Jackson Wild, UNEP and CITES World Wildlife Day Showcase, New York, 2020
 Tarshis Film Award — Animal Film Festival, California, 2018
 Best National Youth Film — CMS Vatavaran, New Delhi, 2019
 Best Student Documentary — Woodpecker International Film Festival, New Delhi, 2018
 Special Jury Award — Smita Patil International Documentary and Short Film Festival, Pune, 2018
 Best Documentary Short — Independent Shorts Award, 2018
 Special Mention — International Nature Film Festival Gödöllő - Hungary, 2019
 Best TV Reportage — 35rd Ménigoute Festival International du Film Ornithologique, Ménigoute 2019

 Finalist — Elements Film Festival, Canada 2018
 Finalist — NaturVision Film Festival, Germany 2018
 Finalist — Miami Independent Film Festival 2018
 Finalist — Golden Hollywood International Film Festival, Los Angeles, California 2019
 Finalist, Special Mention by WWF Sassari — Life After Oil International Film Festival, Sardegna 2019
 Finalist — Latin American Nature Awards, 2020

 Official Selection, Viva Film Festival, Sarajevo 2019
 Official Selection, Norwich Film Festival, Norfolk, 2018
 Official Selection, National Film Festival for Talented Youth, Seattle, 2018
 Annual European Union Film Festival Showcase, 2020
 Official Selection, Green Film Network Awards, 2020

References 

Indian documentary films
Documentary films about women in India